The Critérium du Québec (also known as the Rally of Canada) was a rally competition that was part of the World Rally Championship from 1977 to 1979. Critérium du Québec was Canada's second WRC event after the Rally of the Rideau Lakes, which was part of the calendar in 1974.

History 
The 5ème Critérium Molson du Québec was the first edition of the rally on the World Rally Championship schedule. Fiat took a double win with its 131 Abarth both in 1977 and 1978, first with Timo Salonen and Simo Lampinen and a year later with Walter Röhrl and Markku Alén. The 1979 event, won by Björn Waldegård in a Ford Escort RS1800, was the rally's final appearance in the WRC.

Winners

External links 
 Critérium du Québec at World Rally Archive
 Critérium du Québec at RallyBase

Motorsport competitions in Canada
World Rally Championship rallies
Recurring sporting events established in 1977
Recurring sporting events disestablished in 1979